Aubrey is an unincorporated community in the town of Ithaca, Richland County, Wisconsin, United States. The community was named in honor of Auburn Cass, an early settler in the area.

Notes

Unincorporated communities in Richland County, Wisconsin
Unincorporated communities in Wisconsin